Klub Sportowy Polonia was a  football club based in Vilnius, Lithuania. KS Polonia was formed on 18 March 1990 by Poles from Vilnius.

History 
The Club was founded on March 18, 1990, under the name Poles Club of Lithuania "Polonia". The first president was Janusz Jaszczanin. The Vilnius club was added as the Lithuanian authorities forbade the sport club to cover all of Lithuania. In 1999 the club was called Ardena, and in 2000 he returned to the name Polonia. The 2010 season of fourth tier league club finished fourth. In the 2011 season, the Polish team played in the second division, which means the third level in the league pyramid. The team led by Wiktor Filipowicz took first place and promoted to Lithuanian base A Lyga. The club was also in the Lithuanian Cup, where he reached the 1/8 finals. In the season 2012 Polonia took off in the first division, where at the end of the season she took 5th place. Lithuania Club Cup finals ended in 1/16 finals. On October 13, 2012, the team played a friendly match against Polonia Warsaw at the invitation of the Warsaw fans. In the following season, the club was on the verge of bankruptcy. Finally, on April 9, 2014, the Polonia Vilnius football team was withdrawn from the Lithuanian First League, which is equivalent to its solution. The cause was financial problems.

Name chronology:
1990-1993: Polonia Vilnius
1994: Polonia-Janusz Vilnius
1995-1998: Polonia Vilnius 
1999: Ardena Vilnius
since 2000: Polonia Vilnius

Honours 
The club's honours:
 I Lyga (II)  
 5 th: 2012/2013
 Lithuanian Football Cup
 1/8 finals: 2011/2012

References

External links 
 

Defunct football clubs in Lithuania
2014 disestablishments in Lithuania
Association football clubs disestablished in 2014
KS Polonia Vilnius
1990 establishments in Lithuania
Diaspora sports clubs
Polish association football clubs in Lithuania